Artena eccentrica is a species of moth of the family Erebidae first described by Yoshimoto in 1999. It is found on Mindanao in the Philippines.

References

Catocalinae
Moths described in 1999
Moths of Asia